Deified is a solo studio album by American rapper Keak da Sneak. It was released on February 19, 2008 via AllNDaDoe/Koch Records. Production was handled by David "Mozart" Korkis, Traxamillion, CHOPS, Droop-E, The Slapboyz and DJ Vlad. It features guest appearances from Paul Wall, Bra-Hef, Celly Cel, Chingo Bling, Clyde Carson, Daz Dillinger, E-40, Lil' Keke, Lil' Retro, Matt Blaque, Messy Marv, Mistah F.A.B., Prodigy, San Quinn, Scoot, The Alchemist, The Jacka, Too $hort and Yaberation. The album sold 3,800 copies in its first week on shelves, debuting at #196 on the US Billboard 200 chart.

Track listing

Personnel
Sam Bostic – guitar (track 5)
David "Mozart" Korkis – mixing, mastering
Paul Grosso – art direction, design, creative direction
Laurel Dann – A&R
Marleny Dominguez – management
Deborah Rigaud – legal
Jane Minovskaya – production manager
Regena Ratcliffe – production manager
Gazelle Alexander – product manager
Sean Rock – product manager
Alex Rago – product manager
Dee Sonaram – promotion
Shadow Stokes – promotion
Christian Mariano – marketing direction, video production
Chris Herche – digital marketing
David Bosch – press marketing
Giovanna Melchiorre – press marketing

Chart history

References

External links
 Deified on Discogs

2008 albums
E1 Music albums
Keak da Sneak albums
MNRK Music Group albums
Albums produced by Droop-E